Schloss Favorite may refer to:
 Schloss Favorite, Ludwigsburg, a Baroque pleasure and hunting lodge in Ludwigsburg, Germany
 Schloss Favorite (Rastatt), a château in Rastatt-Förch, Germany
 , a Baroque château that existed between 1722 and 1793 in Mainz, Germany

See also 
 Favorite (disambiguation)
 Favorita (disambiguation)